The green hermit (Phaethornis guy) is a large hummingbird that is a resident breeder from southern Central America (Costa Rica and Panama) south to northern South America (north-eastern Venezuela and Trinidad, and the northern Andes of eastern Peru)

Description
The male is mainly dark green with a blue-green rump. It has a dark mask through the eye, with buff stripes above and below this, and down the centre of the throat. The central feathers of the tapered tail are—for large hermit—relatively short and white-tipped, and are wiggled in display at the communal leks. The reddish bill is long and decurved. The female is sooty gray (rather than green) below, with an even longer bill and a much longer tail. The call of this species is a loud zurk, and the males' lekking "song" is a repeated swark.

Distribution and habitat
The nominate subspecies Phaethornis guy guy is found in Venezuela and Trinidad. The western P. g. apicalis of the American cordillera is slightly smaller and the sexes more similar.

This hermit inhabits forest undergrowth, usually near water, and prefers hilly areas. It seems to favor primary rainforest and wet premontane forest, and though it tolerates some amount of habitat destruction (e.g. subsistence farmland) it will try to avoid secondary forest as long as better habitat is available. In the Colombian Cordillera Oriental, it has been recorded at altitudes from  ASL. Clusiaceae).

Behaviour

Feeding
The food of this species is nectar, taken from a wide variety of flowers, and some small insects; it prefers flowers 30–50 mm long by 2–7 mm wide, though it will occasionally visit flowers up to 75 mm long and 20 mm wide or as short as 15 mm. At Monteverde (Costa Rica), preferred foodplants include yellow jacobinia (Justicia umbrosa) and Razisea spicata (Acanthaceae), Pitcairnia brittoniana (Bromeliaceae), spiral ginger (Costus barbatus, Costaceae), Drymonia conchocalyx and D. rubra (Gesneriaceae), Heliconia tortuosa (Heliconiaceae), and Malvaviscus palmanus (Malvaceae). Less commonly visited flowers were mostly Gesneriaceae, Heliconiaceae (such as Heliconia bihai), Acanthaceae (such as Pachystachys coccinea) and Zingiberales, but also certain Bromeliaceae (such as Tillandsia fasciculata) Campanulaceae (such as Centropogon surinamensis), Ericaceae and Rubiaceae.

Breeding
As noted above, males assemble at leks for courtship. In the Colombian Cordillera Oriental, active leks were observed between September and November, but neither in August nor in December, indicating a distinct breeding season. The green hermit lays one egg in a conical nest suspended under a large leaf, usually over water. Incubation is 17–18 days, and fledging another 21 to 23 days.

References

Notes

Sources
 ffrench, Richard; O'Neill, John Patton & Eckelberry, Don R. (1991): A guide to the birds of Trinidad and Tobago (2nd edition). Comstock Publishing, Ithaca, N.Y.. 
 Hilty, Steven L. (2003): Birds of Venezuela. Christopher Helm, London. 
 Salaman, Paul G.W.; Stiles, F. Gary; Bohórquez, Clara Isabel; Álvarez-R., Mauricio; Umaña, Ana María; Donegan, Thomas M. & Cuervo, Andrés M. (2002): New and noteworthy bird records from the east slope of the Andes of Colombia. Caldasia 24(1): 157–189. PDF fulltext
 Temeles, E.J.; Linhart, Y.B.; Masonjones, M. & Masonjones, H.D. (2002): The role of flower width in hummingbird bill length-flower length relationships. Biotropica 34(1): 68–80.  PDF fulltext

External links
 Green Hermit videos
 Green Hermit Photo Article
 Stamps (for Trinidad and Tobago) with range map
 Green Hermit photo gallery

green hermit
Birds of Costa Rica
Birds of Panama
Birds of the Northern Andes
Birds of Trinidad and Tobago
Hummingbird species of Central America
Hummingbird species of South America
green hermit
Taxa named by René Lesson